In all forms of aviation, ground crew (also known as ground operations in civilian aviation) are personnel that service aircraft while on the ground, during routine turn-around; as opposed to aircrew, who operate all aspects of an aircraft whilst in flight. The term ground crew is used by both civilian commercial airlines and in military aviation.

Aircraft ground crew
Dependent on the type of aircraft being operated, airline ground crew members typically include: airframe technicians, engine technicians, avionics technicians.

Military aircraft
Military aircraft equipped with either weapons and / or an ejector seat will also require a dedicated weapons technician ground crew member.

Non-powered flight
Ground crew required for non-powered flight, such as gliders will include people who manually handle the glider aircraft from their storage location (such as an aircraft hangar) to their respective launch site, and then to return them at the end of flying.  Aero-towed launched gliders will require ground crew commensurate with supporting the tow aircraft, which are typically single piston-engined general aviation (GA) small lightweight utility variants, often Cessna.  For winch-launched gliders, ground crew will also include the winch-launch operator(s), and also a pay-out vehicle operator whose purpose is to draw or pay-out the winch launch cables (usually two cables per launch vehicle) which will be located at the far end of the upwind side of the airfield, to the gliders awaiting their turn to launch at the opposite end of the airfield.

Non-controlled flight
For those aircraft that do not possess any controls for changing the direction course of the aircraft, commonly known as hot-air balloons, these require particularly unique ground crew.  Their roles include preparing the passenger basket (or gondola) with the correct amount of pressurized gas for the burners, testing of the burners, calculating the total mass of the balloon pilot and all passengers, calculating and applying appropriate ballast weight (fixed internal and releasable external).  Then the assembly of the passenger basket to its lift balloon envelope, laying out the balloon envelope fabric in a manner that facilitates efficient inflation.  Prior to launch, it will require personnel to 'waft' the balloon envelope during horizontal burner operation to ensure an efficient fill.  When the balloon envelope it itself airborne (but still not able to lift the basket with its pilot and any passengers), the ground crew will be required to hold ground tug ropes, to maintain the correct position of the balloon over the now vertically firing burner, and to prevent the basket from being uncontrollably dragged along the ground, until the balloon is totally full and capable of launch.

Once in flight, the hot air balloon ground crew undertakes a new task, that of driving one or more 'chase vehicles', initially to follow the progress and trajectory of the balloon in flight as best it can.  Most hot air balloons have zero aviation-specific navigation aids, though modern pilots will typically utilize satellite navigation features found on many smartphones, along with the mobile voice telephony to maintain contact with the chase vehicle.  The final task of the chase vehicle will be to locate and attend the balloon landing site, to repatriate any passengers back to their respective location, and also to thoroughly deflate the balloon envelope, then correctly fold and stow away the envelope, along with the basket, and deliver all balloon equipment and its pilot back to their preferred location.

Airport ground crew
Ground crew who are employed by the individual airport include personnel who are tasked to do the following operations: aircraft fuelling suppliers, toilet effluent tank extraction operatives, interior cabin cleaners, aircraft exterior de-icing operatives, on-board food delivery suppliers (for crew and passengers), baggage, cargo and / or freight handlers (for loading and offloading into the lower hold), ramp agents and boarding gate operatives, flight dispatchers, and even customer service agents, may also loosely be described as ground crew.

Other typical airport ground crew include personnel who are responsible for regular routine sweeping of all operational runways, runway exits and hold points, taxiways, hardstanding (parking) areas, and passenger terminal areas (including sky-bridges or 'gates'); for clearing of any general and typical debris or garbage (most commonly collected on runways is tyre debris, and wind-blown dirt, sand, earth, grass, etc; not only from ambient winds, but also from the vortices generated by the aerodynamic elements of an aircraft at speed, along with engine induction and jet exhaust thrust).  This is absolutely critical to safe airport operations, as it the major process used to prevent foreign object damage (FOD), whereby a foreign object could sucked into an aircraft engine, or cut and puncture aircraft tyres.  On military facilities, ground crew members are tasked with daily FOD walks, or 'FOD plods', whereby a team of people will fan out in a line across the entire width of the runway, and walk the length of the entire active runway, to visually inspect the runway surface, and its immediate environs, to look for and removes any items or 'foreign objects' found; this is typically done in the morning, prior to the first despatch of an aircraft for that day.

Virtually all airports which cater for large aircraft will have a fleet of pushback tugs.  Other possible classifications of airport ground crews may include airport shuttle bus drivers, airport firefighters, first aid and qualified medical services, police (often armed in these days of high risks of potential terrorist attacks), and general guard and security services.  Airports with international connections will also have passport control agents, border, customs and immigration force officers.  Many airports also have a live animal reception centre, staffed by vets, veterinary nurses, and administrators; for the purposes of checking animal health and welfare, along with correct documentation such as permits to fly, pet passports, etc, and will also be responsible for the prevention of importing any illegal, prohibited, or endangered species of animal.

Dependent on geographic location, other airport ground crew may also employ winter service vehicles, specifically snow clearance vehicles; including fleets of multiple sweepers, ploughs, and snow blowers.  Ground de-icing operatives may be used; whereby one or more vehicles, similar to an agricultural crop sprayer with fold-out extendible boom arms is used to spray a non-corrosive aircraft-safe de-icing fluid onto all operational hard surfaces, to melt any existing surface ice, and prevent the formation of new ice during the certified operating hours of the airport.  Furthermore, teams of avian dispersal agents, commonly known as 'bird scarers' will be utilised to clear any birds, especially along the entire length runway, and also on the runway approach glide-paths, and runway departure paths.

Military airport
For military airbases which operate (or may be required to operate) armed aircraft, ie, those aircraft capable of carrying explosive ordnance, or rapid-fire canons; an extremely specific ground crew role is the weapons technician.

See also

Ground support equipment
Aircraft maintenance
Aircraft maintenance checks
Aircraft maintenance engineer
Aircraft maintenance technician
Airworthiness

References

Occupations in aviation
Aircraft mechanics